Aquaporin-7 (AQP-7) is a protein that in humans is encoded by the AQP7 gene.

Aquaporins/major intrinsic proteins (MIP) are a family of water-selective membrane channels. Aquaporin-7 has greater sequence similarity with AQP3 and AQP9 and they may be a subfamily. Aquaporin-7 and AQP3 are at the same chromosomal location suggesting that 9p13 may be a site of an aquaporin cluster. Aquaporin-7 facilitates water, glycerol and urea transport. It may play an important role in thermoregulation in the form of perspiration, and sperm function.

References

Further reading

External links